Edmund Butler may refer to:

 Edmund Butler, Earl of Carrick (c. 1270–1321)
 Sir Edmund Butler of Cloughgrenan (1534–1602)
 Edmund Butler (bishop) (died 1551), Irish archbishop of Cashel and illegitimate son of Piers Butler, 8th Earl of Ormond
 Edmund Butler, 2nd Baron Cahir (died 1560)
 Edmund Butler, 2nd Viscount Mountgarret (c. 1562–1602)
 Edmund Butler, 4th Viscount Mountgarret (1595–1679)
 Edmund Butler, 10th Viscount Mountgarret
 Edmund Butler, 11th Viscount Mountgarret (1745–1793), Irish peer and politician
 Edmund Butler, 1st Earl of Kilkenny (1771–1846)
 Edmund MacRichard Butler (c. 1420–1464)
 Sir Edmund Butler, 2nd Baronet (died c.1650)
 Edmund Butler (industrialist) (1848–1923)

See also
 Edmond Butler (disambiguation)
 Butler baronets, several of whom were named Edmund
 Butler (surname)